The following list is a discography of production and co-production by Sean Combs, sometimes credited as Puffy, P. Diddy or simply Diddy. It includes a list of songs produced, co-produced and remixed by year, artist, album and title. Alongside this, Combs was also a leading member of the in-house label production team The Hitmen.

1991

* Jodeci – Forever My Lady 
 "Come and Talk to Me (Remix)"

1992

Mary J. Blige – What's the 411? 
 01. "Leave a Message"
 02. "Reminisce"
 05. "Intro Talk" (feat. Busta Rhymes)
 11. "Changes I've Been Going Through"
 12. "What's the 411?" (feat. Grand Puba)

1993

Mary J. Blige – What's the 411? Remix 
 02. "You Don't Have to Worry" (feat. Craig Mack)
 04. "Real Love" (feat. Ron G)
 05. "What's the 411?" (feat. The Notorious B.I.G., K-Ci)
 06. "Reminisce"
 09. "Love No Limit" (feat. Kid Capri)
 10. "You Remind Me"

1994

The Notorious B.I.G. – Ready to Die 
 01. "Intro"
 07. "One More Chance"
 08. "#!*@ Me (Interlude)"
 10. "Juicy"
 12. "Me & My Bitch"
 13. "Big Poppa"
 14. "Respect"
 18. "Who Shot Ya?"

TLC – CrazySexyCool 
 06. "CrazySexyCool (Interlude)"
 11. "If I Was Your Girlfriend" [written by Prince]
 12. "Sexy (Interlude)"
 14. "Can I Get a Witness (Interlude)" (feat. Busta Rhymes)

Mary J. Blige – My Life 
 01. "Intro"
 02. "Mary Jane (All Night Long)"
 03. "You Bring Me Joy"
 04. "Marvin (Interlude)"
 05. "I'm The Only Woman"
 07. "My Life"
 10. "I'm Goin' Down"
 11. "My Life (Interlude)"
 12. "Be With You"
 13. "Mary's Joint"
 14. "Don't Go"
 15. "I Love You"
 17. "Be Happy"

1995

The Show: The Soundtrack 
 10. Mary J. Blige, Faith Evans – "Everyday It Rains"
 25. The Notorious B.I.G. – "Me And My Bitch (Live From Philly)"

Faith Evans – Faith 
 02. "No Other Love"
 03. "Fallin' in Love"
 04. "Ain't Nobody"
 06. "Love Don't Live Here Anymore" (feat. Mary J. Blige)
 07. "Come Over" 
 08. "Soon As I Get Home"
 09. "All This Love"
 11. "You Used to Love Me"
 12. "Give It to Me"
 13. "You Don't Understand"
 15. "Reasons"

1996

Various Artists – High School High (soundtrack) 
05. "I Just Can't" (Faith Evans) (co-produced with Stevie J.)

Total – Total 
 02. "Do You Know"
 04. "Whose Is It? (Interlude)" 
 07. "Definition Of a Bad Girl (Interlude)" 
 08. "Can't You See" (feat. The Notorious B.I.G.)
 09. "Someone Like You"
 11. "Love Is All We Need"
 12. "Don't Ever Change"
 13. "Spend Some Time"
 14. "When Boy Meets Girl"
 15. "No One Else (Puff Daddy Remix)" (feat. Lil' Kim, Foxy Brown, Da Brat)

New Edition – Home Again 
 03. "You Don't Have to Worry"

MC Lyte – Bad as I Wanna B 
 00. "Cold Rock A Party" (Bad Boy Remix) featuring Missy Elliott

The Isley Brothers featuring Ronald Isley and Angela Winbush 
 00. "Floatin' On Your Love" ("Float On" Bad Boy Remix) featuring Lil' Kim and 112

1997

Boyz II Men – Evolution 
"Can't Let Her Go" (co-produced with Stevie J.)

The Notorious B.I.G. – Life After Death 
CD1
 01. "Life After Death (Intro)"
 02. "Somebody's Gotta Die"
 03. "Hypnotize"
 05. "Fuck You Tonight" (feat. R. Kelly)
 10. "Mo Money Mo Problems" (feat. Puff Daddy & Ma$e)
CD2
 01. "Notorious Thugs" (feat. Bone Thugs-n-Harmony)
 03. "Another" (feat. Lil' Kim)
 06. "Playa Hater"
 07. "Nasty Boy" 
 09. "The World Is Filled..." (feat. Puff Daddy & Too Short)
 10. "My Downfall" (feat. DMC) 
 12. "You're Nobody (Til Somebody Kills You)"

KRS-One – I Got Next 
 19. "Step into a World (Rapture's Delight) (Remix)" (feat. Puff Daddy, Keva)

Puff Daddy and the Family – No Way Out 
 02. "Victory" (feat. The Notorious B.I.G., Busta Rhymes)
 03. "Been Around the World" (feat. The Notorious B.I.G., Mase)
 04. "What You Gonna Do?"
 05. "Don't Stop What You're Doing" (feat. Lil' Kim)
 06. "If I Should Die Tonight (Interlude)" (feat. Carl Thomas)
 07. "Do You Know?" (feat. Kelly Price)
 09. "I Love You Baby" (feat. Black Rob)
 10. "It's All about the Benjamins" (feat. The Notorious B.I.G., The LOX, Lil' Kim)
 11. "Pain" (feat. Carl Thomas)
 12. "Is This The End?" (feat. Carl Thomas, Ginuwine, Twista)
 13. "I Got The Power" (feat. The LOX)
 14. "Friend" (feat. Foxy Brown, Simone Hines)
 15. "Señorita"
 16. "I'll Be Missing You" (feat. Faith Evans, 112)
 17. "Can't Nobody Hold Me Down" (feat. Mase)

Brian McKnight – Anytime 
 03. "You Should Be Mine (Don't Waste Your Time)" (feat.  Mase & Kelly Price)

Mariah Carey – Butterfly 
 01. "Honey"
 06. "Breakdown" (feat. Bone Thugs-n-Harmony)

Busta Rhymes – When Disaster Strikes 
 17. "The Body Rock" (feat. Rampage, Puff Daddy, Mase)

LL Cool J – Phenomenon 
 01. "Phenomenon"
 06. "Hot Hot Hot"

Mase – Harlem World 
 01. "The Life In New York (Intro)"
 05. "Will They Die 4 U?" (feat. Puff Daddy, Lil' Kim)
 12. "Feel So Good" (feat. Kelly Price)
 13. "What You Want" (feat. Total)
 19. "Wanna Hurt Mase?"
 20. "Jealous Guy" (feat. 112)

Jay-Z – In My Lifetime, Vol. 1 
 03. "I Know What Girls Like" (feat. Lil' Kim, Puff Daddy)

1998

The LOX – Money, Power & Respect 
 02. "Livin' The Life"
 06. "Get This $" (feat. Puff Daddy)
 11. "The Heist, Pt. 1"
 12. "Not To Be Fucked With"
 15. "Can't Stop, Won't Stop" (feat. Puff Daddy)
 17. "So Right" (feat. Kelly Price)

Aretha Franklin – A Rose Is Still A Rose 
 02. "Never Leave You Again"

R. Kelly – R. 
CD1
 02. "Spendin' Money" (feat. Kelly Price)

Godzilla: The Album 
 02. Puff Daddy – "Come with Me" (feat. Jimmy Page)

Motown 40 Forever 
 19. Jackson 5 – "I Want You Back '98" (feat. Black Rob & Puff Daddy)

Total – Kima, Keisha, and Pam 
 03. "Rock Track"
 06. "Press Rewind" (feat. Carl Thomas)
 09. "What About Us (Bad Boy Remix)" (feat. Black Rob)
 12. "Rain"

1999

Jennifer Lopez – On the 6 
 04. "Feelin' So Good" (feat. Big Pun, Fat Joe)

Puff Daddy – Forever 
 01. "Forever (Intro)"
 03. "I'll Do This For You" (feat. Kelly Price)
 04. "Do You Like It... Do You Want It..." (feat. Jay-Z)
 05. "Satisfy You" (feat. R. Kelly)
 06. "Is This The End (Part Two)" (feat. Twista, Cheri Dennis)
 07. "I Hear Voices" (feat. Carl Thomas)
 08. "Fake Thugs Dedication" (feat. Redman)
 09. "Diddy Speaks! (Interlude)"
 10. "Angels With Dirty Faces" (feat. Bizzy Bone)
 11. "Gangsta Shit" (feat. Lil' Kim, Mark Curry)
 13. "Pain" (feat. G. Dep)
 16. "Journey Through The Life" (feat. Lil' Kim, Joe Hooker, Beanie Sigel, Nas)
 17. "Best Friend" (feat. Mario Winans, Hezekiah Walker)
 19. "P.E. 2000" (feat. Hurricane G)

The Notorious B.I.G. – Born Again 
 02. "Notorious B.I.G." (feat. Lil' Kim, Puff Daddy)
 03. "Dead Wrong" (feat. Eminem)
 07. "Niggas"
 09. "Would You Die For Me?" (feat. Lil' Kim, Puff Daddy)
 13. "Tonight" (feat. Mobb Deep, Joe Hooker)
 17. "I Really Want To Show You" (feat. K-Ci & JoJo, Nas)

2000

Heavy D – Heavy Hitz
 9. "You Can't See What I Can See"

Black Rob – Life Story 
 15. "Thug Story"

Ice Cube – War & Peace Vol. 2 (The Peace Disc) 
 11. "Gotta Be Insanity"

Carl Thomas – Emotional 
 08. "Woke Up in the Morning"

Shyne – Shyne 
 13. "That's Gangsta"

2001

Dream – It Was All a Dream 
 03. "In My Dreams"
 09. "What We Gonna Do About Us"
 11. "Mr. Telephone Man"
 12. "Angel Inside"
 17. "He Loves U Not (Remix)"

Jennifer Lopez – J.Lo 
 04. "Walking on Sunshine"
 07. "Come Over"
 09. "That's Not Me"
 10. "Dance with Me"

P. Diddy and the Bad Boy Family – The Saga Continues... 
 01. "The Saga Continues" (feat. G. Dep, Loon, Black Rob)
 06. "Shiny Suit Man (Interlude)"
 09. "Airport (Interlude)"
 12. "Where's Sean?" (feat. Loon, Mark Curry, Black Rob, Kain, Big Azz Ko, Bristal)
 16. "Smoke (Interlude)"
 17. "Lonely" (feat. Mark Curry, Kain, Kokane)
 19. "Nothing's Gonna Stop Me Now (Interlude)" (feat. Faith Evans, Mario Winans)
 23. "Can't Believe" (feat. Faith Evans, Carl Thomas)

Training Day: The Soundtrack 
 10. P. Diddy, Mark Curry, Black Rob, David Bowie – "American Dream"

G. Dep – Child of the Ghetto 
 07. "Smash on the First Night" (feat. May)
 14. "Doe Fiend"

Limp Bizkit – New Old Songs 
 04. "My Way (The P. Diddy Remix)"

2002

Jennifer Lopez – J to tha L-O!: The Remixes 
 07. "Feelin' So Good (Bad Boy Remix)" (feat. P. Diddy, G. Dep)

P. Diddy and the Bad Boy Family – We Invented the Remix 
 01. "Intro"
 03. "I Need a Girl (Part Two)" (feat. Ginuwine, Mario Winans, Loon)
 05. "I Need a Girl (Part One)" (feat. Usher, Loon)
 06. "The Remix Phenomenon (Interlude)"
 09. "No More Drama (Remix)" (feat. Mary J. Blige)
 10. "So Complete (Remix)" (feat. Cheri Dennis)
 12. "That's Crazy (Remix)" (feat. Black Rob, Missy Elliott, Snoop Dogg, G. Dep)
 13. "Woke Up in the Morning (Remix)" (feat. Carl Thomas, The Notorious B.I.G.)
 14. "You Gets No Love (Remix)" (feat. G. Dep, Faith Evans)

3LW – A Girl Can Mack 
 01. "I Do (Wanna Get Close to You)" (feat. Loon)

2003

Mario Winans – Hurt No More 
 04. "You Knew" (feat. Slim)

Bad Boys II OST 
 02. P. Diddy, Lenny Kravitz, Pharrell, Loon – "Show Me Your Soul"
 06. Beyoncé – "Keep Giving Your Love to Me"
 09. Snoop Dogg, Loon – "Gangsta Shit"
 12. Justin Timberlake – "Love Don't Love Me"
 14. Mary J. Blige – "Didn't Mean"

Mary J. Blige – Love & Life 
 01. "Love & Life Intro" (feat. Jay-Z, P. Diddy)
 02. "Don't Go"
 03. "When We"
 05. "Finally Made It (Interlude)"
 06. "Ooh!"
 07. "Let Me Be the 1"
 08. "Love @ 1st Sight" (feat. Method Man)
 09. "Willing & Waiting"
 10. "Free (Interlude)"
 11. "Friends"
 12. "Press On"
 13. "Feel Like Makin' Love"
 14. "It's a Wrap"
 15. "Message In Our Music (Interlude)"
 16. "All My Love"
 17. "Special Part Of Me"
 18. "Ultimate Relationship (A.M.)"

Britney Spears – In the Zone 
 14. "The Answer"

2004

Method Man – Tical 0: The Prequel 
 03. "Say What" (feat. Missy Elliott)

2006

Ice Cube – Laugh Now, Cry Later 
 08. "Laugh Now, Cry Later"

Diddy – Press Play 
 01. "Testimonial (Intro)"
 03. "I Am (Interlude)" (feat. Aasim)
 06. "Come to Me" (feat. Nicole Scherzinger)
 12. "Special Feeling" (feat. Mika Lett)

2007

8Ball & MJG – Ridin High 
 12. "Alcohol Pussy Weed"

Jay-Z – American Gangster 
 02. "Pray"
 03. "American Dreamin'"
 05. "No Hook"
 06. "Roc Boys (And the Winner Is)..."
 07. "Sweet"
 09. "Party Life"

2008

Cheri Dennis – In and Out of Love 
 17. "Freak" (Japan bonus track)

Day26 – Day26 
 02. "Got Me Going
 06. "Co Star"

Donnie Klang – Just a Rolling Stone 
 02. "Take You There" (feat. Diddy)

2011

Diddy – Dirty Money – Last Train to Paris 
 10. "Angels" (feat. The Notorious B.I.G., Rick Ross) produced with Mario Winans

2013

Pitbull – Meltdown 
 05. "All the Things" (feat. Inna) produced with Calvin Harris and Burns

2014

Rick Ross – Mastermind 
 05. "Nobody" (feat. French Montana) produced with DJ Enuff and Jiv Pos
10. "Supreme"

2015

Kanye West – Non-album  single
00. "All Day"

Puff Daddy – MMM (Money Making Mitch) 
 01. "Facts"
 02. "Harlem" (feat. Gizzle)
 03. "Help Me" (feat. Sevyn Streeter)
 04. "Everyday (Amor)" (feat. Jadakiss, Styles P, Pusha T, Tish Hyman)
 05. "Auction" (feat. Lil' Kim, King Los, Styles P)
 11. "Old Man Wildin'" (feat. Jadakiss, Styles P)

Pusha T – King Push – Darkest Before Dawn: The Prelude 
 01. "Intro"
 04. "Crutches, Crosses, Caskets"
 07. "Keep Dealing" (feat. Beanie Sigel)

2017

Faith Evans & The Notorious B.I.G. – The King & I 
 17. "Got Me Fuccd Up”

2020

Burna Boy — Twice as Tall
 02. "Alarm Clock" 
 03. "Way Too Big" 
 07. "Naughty By Nature" 
Also executive producer

2021

French Montana — They Got Amnesia

01. "ICU" 

Also executive producer

References

Production discographies
Hip hop discographies
Discographies of American artists
Production Discography